Charles Gordon Greene (July 1, 1804 – September 27, 1886) was an American journalist.

Biography
Greene was born at Boscawen, New Hampshire. He was the brother of Nathaniel Greene, in whose care he was placed on the death of his father in 1812, and who sent him to the Bradford Academy. Subsequently, he entered his brother's office in Haverhill, Massachusetts, and, following his brother to Boston, he assisted in editing the Boston Statesman. He then had brief engagements managing and editing the Taunton Free Press (1825) and then publishing the Boston Spectator (1826).
He married Charlotte Hill in Boston on October 24, 1827.

Greene settled in Philadelphia in 1827, and with James A. Jones started the National Palladium, in which the presidential candidacy of Andrew Jackson was vigorously advocated. In 1828 Greene was on the staff of the United States Telegraph in Washington, D.C., until after Jackson's election, when he returned to the Boston Statesman, where he succeeded his brother as proprietor.  He founded The Boston Post in 1831 and conducted it until 1875.  Greene served in the Massachusetts Legislature, and was naval officer of Boston from 1853 to 1861.

He died in Boston on September 27, 1886

See also
 Okay ("O.K." - a wordplay for "Oll Korrect") that has come to mean affirmation or acknowledgement.

Notes

References
 
 

1804 births
1886 deaths
19th-century American newspaper editors
Politicians from Boston
People from Boscawen, New Hampshire
Democratic Party members of the Massachusetts House of Representatives
American male journalists
19th-century American male writers
19th-century American politicians
The Boston Post people